Richard Ferdinand “Dick” Fenske (born May 23, 1929, in Milwaukee; died December 14, 2011) was a chemist who taught at the University of Wisconsin–Madison for thirty years. He was chair of the chemistry department from 1972 until 1977 and retired from teaching in 1999.

With Michael B. Hall, he developed the Fenske-Hall method, an ab initio molecular orbital method.

Biography
Fenske was one of ten children born to Bernard and Mary Fenske. He earned a B.S. in chemistry from Marquette University in 1952 and a Ph. D. in chemistry from Iowa State University in 1961.

Publications
A list of his publications is available at Academic Tree.

References

1929 births
2011 deaths
American chemists
University of Wisconsin–Madison faculty
Marquette University alumni
Iowa State University alumni